Schuiten is a surname. Notable people with the surname include:

François Schuiten (born 1956), Belgian comics artist
Roy Schuiten (1950–2006), Dutch cyclist